Sullivan Walker (20 November 1946 – 20 February 2012) was a Trinidadian actor who played numerous small and recurring roles on television shows from 1980 until 2005. Walker migrated to New York from Trinidad in 1969 and became an actor, writer, director and teacher.

Early life
Walker was born in Laventille, Trinidad, on 20 November 1946. He was raised in Broadway in the city of San Fernando. He initially began a career as a teacher at St. Paul's Anglican School in San Fernando.

Professional work
Walker acted in television shows, on The Cosby Show from 1988 to 1991 portraying Cliff Huxtable's physician friend, Dr. James Harmon. He guest-starred in episodes of The Pretender (1999), The Sentinel (1997), and Law & Order: Special Victims Unit (2004). He also played a bit part in several movies, including Crocodile Dundee (1986). His most significant role was in the 1994–95 show Earth 2, where he appeared in nearly every episode as Yale, a cybernetic advisor to Devon Adair (Debrah Farentino) and tutor to her son, Uly. His final role was in the 2005 movie Get Rich or Die Tryin'.

Outside of film and television Walker was also a Broadway actor, acting in August Wilson's Two Trains Running. Toward the end of his life, he endeavored to found a school/workshops for Caribbean actors in New York to succeed in the American film and television markets.

Death
Walker died of a heart attack on February 20, 2012, in his home in Los Angeles, California, three months after his 65th birthday. He was survived by his daughter and only child, Keela Walker.  
His remains were cremated.

Filmography

References

External links

1946 births
2012 deaths
Male actors from New York City
American male film actors
American male stage actors
American male television actors
Trinidad and Tobago emigrants to the United States
People from Brooklyn
Trinidad and Tobago male television actors
Trinidad and Tobago male film actors
20th-century Trinidad and Tobago male actors
21st-century Trinidad and Tobago male actors
21st-century Trinidad and Tobago actors
20th-century Trinidad and Tobago actors